The Directorate-General for Health and Food Safety (DG SANTE), until 2014 known as the Directorate-General for Health and Consumers (DG SANCO), is a directorate-general of the European Commission. The DG is responsible for the implementation of European Union laws on food safety and health. It is headed by European Commissioner for Health and Food Safety Stella Kyriakides and Director-General Sandra Gallina.

Structure

Directorates
The directorate-general is made up of seven directorates (as of December 2021):
 Directorate A: Resource management and better regulation
 Directorate B: Health systems, medical products and innovation
 Directorate C: Public Health
 Directorate D: Food sustainability, international relations
 Directorate E: Food and feed safety, innovation
 Directorate F: Health and food audits and analysis
 Directorate G: Crisis preparedness in food, animals and plants
Directorates A, B, D, E and G are based in Brussels, Directorate C is based in Luxembourg, and Directorate F in Grange, County Meath, Ireland.

Rapid Alert System for Food and Feed is the EC's food safety rapid alert system.

Scientific committees

DG SANTE manages two independent scientific committees:
 the Scientific Committee on Consumer Safety (SCCS)
 the Scientific Committee on Health, Environmental and Emerging Risks (SHEER)

These scientific committees provide the European Commission with the scientific advice on non-food products that it needs when preparing policy and proposals relating to consumer safety, public health and the environment. The committees also draw the commission's attention to the new or emerging problems which may pose an actual or potential threat.

Agencies

DG SANTE is linked to one executive agency, the Health and Digital Executive Agency (HaDEA), as well as several decentralised agencies of the European Union such as the European Food Safety Authority (EFSA), which the European Commission consults for questions concerning the safety of food products, the Community Plant Variety Office (CPVO), which administers a system of plant variety rights, and the European Centre for Disease Prevention and Control (ECDC), which helps the European Union combat communicable diseases and other serious health threats.

See also
 European Commissioner for Health and Food Safety
 European Centre for Disease Prevention and Control (ECDC)
 Health Threat Unit

References

External links
 Health & Food Safety DG
 The Scientific Committees of DG-SANTE

Health and Consumers
European Union consumer protection policy
European Union health policy
Food safety in the European Union